Pat O'Neill (born 14 November 1958) is an Irish Fine Gael politician  and former senator.

He was elected for a term to Seanad Éireann on the Agricultural Panel in April 2011. He was a member of Kilkenny County Council from 2004 to 2011 representing the Thomastown local electoral area. He was the Fine Gael Seanad spokesperson on Transport.

References

1958 births
Living people
Fine Gael senators
Members of the 24th Seanad
Local councillors in County Kilkenny